Shaarei Tfiloh Synagogue is a historic synagogue located on Druid Hill Park at Baltimore, Maryland, United States. The synagogue is significant due to its association with the immigration of Russian and Eastern European Jews to Baltimore. It is a rock-faced stone structure with large arched stained glass windows and a pedimented roofline surmounted by a central copper-clad dome.  Its name means Gates of Prayer in Hebrew.

History
The synagogue was designed by architect Stanislaus Russell and built on a budget on $250,000. The cornerstone of the Shaarei Tfiloh Synagogue was laid on July 10, 1921. Constructed from 1921 and 1927 for $285,000, it is one of the oldest functioning synagogue buildings in Maryland. It holds 700 men and 300 women. The synagogue has a turquoise dome, stained glass windows, and a sanctuary with a balcony for women's seating. 

At the time the synagogue was built, the surrounding "Park Circle" area was a thriving Jewish community.  However, the Jewish community moved away from the neighborhood during the 1960s, primarily to Upper Park Heights, Randallstown, Pikesville, and Owings Mills. Eventually the synagogue ceased regular Sabbath (Saturday) services and only conducted services on the Jewish High Holy Days.

Its first president was Louis Cordish, father of state politician Paul L. Cordish.

Religious services

Beginning in the mid-2000s, the synagogue started conducting one "weekday" service a week, on Sunday mornings, in an effort to re-invigorate it, although Sabbath services are still not conducted.  The synagogue is also occasionally used for special events (such as weddings) and as a location for "period" photography.

As has been the case since its founding, the synagogue conforms to Orthodox teachings and practices, but welcomes all as worshipers and members, regardless of personal affiliation.

Cemetery
The Shaarei Tfiloh Congregation Cemetery is located on 5800 Windsor Mill Road.

Historic designation
Shaarei Tfiloh Synagogue was listed on the National Register of Historic Places in 1996. It appeared in the 1999 movie Liberty Heights.  Howard Perlow and David Cordish are  co-presidents and David E. Herman is the rabbi.

References

External links

, including photo from 1994, at Maryland Historical Trust

Lithuanian-Jewish culture in Maryland
Neoclassical architecture in Maryland
Neoclassical synagogues
Orthodox Judaism in Baltimore
Orthodox synagogues in Maryland
Polish-Jewish culture in Baltimore
Properties of religious function on the National Register of Historic Places in Baltimore
Synagogues completed in 1927
Synagogue buildings with domes
Russian-Jewish culture in Baltimore
Synagogues in Baltimore
Synagogues on the National Register of Historic Places
Ukrainian-Jewish culture in Baltimore